Virbia rotundata is a moth in the family Erebidae first described by William Schaus in 1904. It is found in Brazil.

References

rotundata
Moths described in 1904